The London Fo Guang Shan Temple is located at 84 Margaret Street, London W1, England. It was established in 1992 and is also known as International Buddhist Progress Society. It is one of two British branches of Fo Guang Shan Order, Taiwan.

The temple is located in a former parish school and Church House of 1868–70 designed by William Butterfield. The building is grade II* listed.

References

External links

Grade II* listed buildings in the City of Westminster
Buddhist temples in London
William Butterfield buildings
Fo Guang Shan temples
1992 establishments in England